Arkansas Highway 19 (AR 19 and Hwy. 19) is a designation for two state highway in South Arkansas. The first route of  runs from Louisiana Highway 159 (LA 159) north to U.S. Route 79B (US 79B) in Magnolia.

Route description

Louisiana to Magnolia
The route begins at the Louisiana state line at Louisiana Highway 159 and runs north to serve as the western terminus for Highway 98 at Walkerville and later the eastern terminus of Highway 160 at Macedonia. The route continues northeast into Magnolia, where the route terminates at US Route 79B.

Prescott to Lake Greeson
Highway 19 begins in Prescott at US 371/AR 24 in the northwest corner of town and runs northwest to meet Highway 200, which is a frontage road for Interstate 30. After the I-30 interchange, Highway 19 continues north to a brief overlap with Highway 29 entering Pike County. The overlap ends with Highway 29 running to Antoine and Highway 19 continuing to Delight. In Murfreesboro, Highway 19 splits and runs north to give access to the Greeson Wildlife Management Area, Riverside Use Area, and Narrows Dam Use Area. The highway terminates at Beacon Hill Road very near the Narrows Dam, which impounds the Little Missouri River to create Lake Greeson.

History

Highway 19 was one of the original state highways, designated in 1926. The route began where US 79 currently crosses the Louisiana state line, and ran north along present-day US 79 to Magnolia. Upon designation, the highway continued north to Prescott via Waldo and Rosston, roughly along today's alignment of US 371 between the communities. In Prescott, the route began a short overlap with Highway 24 to the northwest before splitting and terminating at Highway 26 in Delight. By 1929, Highway 19 was truncated to Highway 26 in Prescott and between May 1934 and April 1935, Highway 19 was replaced by US 79 from Louisiana to Magnolia. Between 1938 and 1939, the northern terminus was extended north to its original terminus in Prescott, and the southern terminus was extended along the route's current alignment to the Louisiana state line along the former Highway 3.

Upon completion of the Narrows Dam in 1951, a paved road was built to the structure from Murfreesboro, but was not initially designated a state highway. By 1953, the road had received the Highway 19 designation it carries today. It is the fact that Highway 26 formerly served as a northern terminus that possibly explains why Highway 26, not Highway 19, is the primary route from Delight to Murfreesboro despite being a lower number.

Major intersections
Mile markers reset at concurrencies.

See also

 List of state highways in Arkansas

References

External links

019
Transportation in Columbia County, Arkansas
Transportation in Nevada County, Arkansas
Transportation in Pike County, Arkansas
U.S. Route 79